Stanford Online High School (OHS or SOHS), formerly known as EPGY Online High School, is a private independent school located at Stanford University for academically talented students worldwide. It operates as a six-year school, serving students in grades 7–12. The current Head of the School is Tomohiro Hoshi.

Stanford OHS used to be part of the wider offerings of the Education Program for Gifted Youth (EPGY). With the restructuring of EPGY into Stanford Pre-Collegiate Studies, Stanford OHS became fully separate in its administration from the other components of the program. Stanford OHS is accredited through the Western Association of Schools and Colleges.

History
In April 2005, EPGY Executive Director, Raymond Ravaglia, proposed the idea of expanding its online course offerings into a full-fledged online school. This informal proposal, made to the Malone Family Foundation of Englewood, Colorado, was well received and the Foundation requested a full proposal.  Over Summer 2005, Ravaglia fleshed out his ideas into a full-blown design for an online school for gifted students.  
In January 2006, EPGY received a substantial gift from the Foundation  to develop the school.

Formally called "The Education Program for Gifted Youth Online High School at Stanford University," it was typically referred to as the EPGY OHS or Stanford EPGY Online High School, often just "OHS." The school officially commenced on September 7, 2006, with students in grades 10–12. The school accepted thirty students for the inaugural year and projected an eventual  enrollment of up to 600 full-time equivalent students. In 2006 Stanford Online High School received official accreditation from the Western Association of Schools and Colleges (WASC). The school was approved as an online provider by the University of California in 2008. Ninth grade was added for the 2008–09 academic year, and with the 2009–10 school year, supported by an additional gift from the Malone Family Foundation, it was able to add a middle-school component for students in grades seven and eight. In January 2015, Stanford OHS became the first online school to be accredited by CAIS.

Until the 2014–15 school year, Stanford OHS used Saba Centra in order to host its classes, but switched to Adobe Connect for the 2014-15 year and has used this platform since then.

Academics
Stanford OHS offers classes in nine major subjects: English, Humanities, Laboratory Sciences, Mathematics, History, Computer Science, Foreign Languages, Wellness, and the Core Sequence. Of these nine, the first seven disciplines offer both honors and Advanced Placement classes.  Stanford OHS also offers university level classes in English, Laboratory Sciences, and Mathematics.

Seminar classes
In seminar courses, web-based video conferencing technology is employed. Concurrent video feeds enable each student to see their classmates and instructors during the seminar, maximizing interaction and engagement. Seminar classes are usually hosted once or twice a week depending on the course.

Placement by ability
At Stanford OHS students are placed in course levels by their individual ability, not by grade level. Each student's schedule is individualized, allowing them to be challenged at every level. Usually, classes have a mix of students in different grade levels.

Core Sequence
The four courses offered in the Core Sequence cover subjects in science, history of science, political theory, and philosophy.  The four-year interdisciplinary Core Sequence focuses on critical thinking, and oral and written argumentation. Placement in these courses is correlated with grade level, but not restricted for students who place higher. Placement in Core typically follows the students' placement in English courses due to the strong writing components of each Core course.

There are two optional 7th and 8th grade classes.

Logos, Cosmos, and Doubt (LCD) optional for 7th grade, an interdisciplinary philosophy course focusing on philosophy of cosmology and logic.
Human Nature and Society (HNS) optional for 8th grade, a core philosophy course examining human nature
 Methodology of Science: Biology (MSB), which introduces students to scientific reasoning, statistical analysis, and philosophical thinking using biology for context.
 History and Philosophy of Science (HSC), which focuses on teaching basic philosophical problems, and the methods used to test the resulting explanations. The main focuses of this course are philosophy of science and history of science.
 Democracy, Freedom, and the Rule of Law (DFRL), where students study changing conceptions of how political states should be organized. The main focus of this course is political philosophy.
 Critical Reading and Argumentation (CRA), which focuses on philosophical thinking about modes of reasoning, philosophical discussions of religious concepts, the nature and limits of knowledge, the nature and content of ethics, and the mind's relation to the world.

Enrollment options
Stanford OHS offers three levels of enrollment, determined by the number of courses a student is enrolled in each academic year. All enrolled students receive an official transcript for courses taken at the school regardless of their enrollment level, and are welcome to participate in Student Life activities online and in-person. College Counseling is only available to full-time students.
Full-time: 4-5 courses
Part-time: 2-3 courses
Single course: 1 course (or two semester-long courses)

Application and admissions
As of 2021, the application requires two essays, two recommendation forms, one student written work sample, a parent questionnaire, and other information. Submitting a standardized test score is optional for all applicants. Students can apply to any or all of the three enrollment levels, as all applicants are considered for each of the three enrollment levels. The application process is the same for each applicant regardless of desired enrollment level or grade level. Applicants to grades 7 or 8 apply through the same application and have the same required materials as applicants to the high school grades 9–12.

Stanford OHS does not admit any students mid-year, as the only new student intake is in the fall. It is rare for graduating seniors (full-time grade 12 students) to be admitted while intending to graduate within one year. Applicants for full-time grade 12 are typically asked to consider taking two years to satisfy Stanford OHS graduation requirements. Applicants to grade 12 for part-time or single course enrollment are not subject to graduation requirements at Stanford OHS, and so may be admitted under a restricted admissions status.

Tuition
Tuition costs at Stanford OHS are determined by enrollment level each year. For the 2021–2022 school year, the tuition at Stanford OHS is $5,310 for single course enrollment, $15,940 for part-time enrollment (2-3 courses), and $26,570 for full-time enrollment (4-5 courses). Financial aid is available, and awarded to students based on financial need. A separate financial aid application is required in order to receive financial aid.

Notable alumni 

 Isabelle Fuhrman, actress (2015)

See also 
Indiana University High School
University of Missouri High School
University of Nebraska High School
University of Texas at Austin High School
Laurel Springs School
Avenues: The World School
Dwight Global Online School
Stride, Inc.
Apex Learning
Connections Academy

References

External links
 OHS website
 Education Program for Gifted Youth at Stanford University

Stanford University
Educational institutions established in 2006
Distance education institutions based in the United States
University-affiliated schools in the United States
2006 establishments in California